The 2013 Pacific-Asia Curling Championships took place from November 11 to 19 at the Fei Yang Skating Centre in Shanghai, China. South Korea were the women's champions, their second title after winning the 2010 Pacific Curling Championships, while China won the men's tournament, extending their winning streak to seven years. The championships served as the Pacific zone qualifiers for the World Curling Championships. The top two women's teams, China and South Korea, qualified for the 2014 Ford World Women's Curling Championship in Saint John, New Brunswick. As the 2014 World Men's Curling Championship will be hosted in Beijing, China, with the hosts as automatic qualifiers, Japan was the single men's team that advanced to the World Championship.

Competition format
The men's tournament had six teams competing, while the women's tournament had five teams, with both tournaments utilizing a double round-robin format. At the conclusion of the round robin tournaments, the top four men's and women's teams played in the semifinals. The semifinal rounds will be best-of-five series, with the two games that the teams played in the round robin counted as the first and second games in the best-of-five series. The medal round, as in previous years, consisted of single games.

Men

Teams
The teams are listed as follows:

Round-robin standings

Round-robin results
All draw times listed in China Standard Time (UTC+8).

Draw 1
Tuesday, November 12, 9:00

Draw 2
Tuesday, November 12, 19:000

Draw 4
Wednesday, November 13, 09:00

Draw 6
Wednesday, November 13, 19:00

Draw 7
Thursday, November 14, 9:00

Draw 9
Thursday, November 14, 19:00

Draw 11
Friday, November 15, 14:00

Draw 12
Saturday, November 16, 9:30

Draw 14
Saturday, November 16, 19:30

Draw 15
Sunday, November 17, 9:00

Draw 16
Sunday, November 17, 14:00

Playoffs

Semifinals

Game 3
Monday, November 18, 9:00

Bronze-medal game
Tuesday, November 19, 14:00

Gold-medal game
Tuesday, November 19, 14:00

Japan qualified for the 2014 World Men's Curling Championship by making the final

Women

Teams
The teams are listed as follows:

Round-robin standings
Final round-robin standings

Round-robin results
All draw times listed in China Standard Time (UTC+8).

Draw 1
Tuesday, November 12, 9:00

Draw 2
Tuesday, November 12, 14:00

Draw 3
Tuesday, November 12, 19:00

Draw 5
Wednesday, November 13, 14:00

Draw 7
Thursday, November 14, 9:00

Draw 8
Thursday, November 14, 14:00

Draw 9
Thursday, November 14, 19:00

Draw 10
Friday, November 15, 9:00

Draw 11
Friday, November 15, 14:00

Draw 12
Saturday, November 16, 9:00

Draw 13
Saturday, November 16, 14:30

Draw 14
Saturday, November 16, 19:30

Draw 15
Sunday, November 17, 9:00

Draw 16
Sunday, November 17, 14:00

Playoffs

Semifinals

Game 3
Monday, November 18, 9:30

Bronze-medal game
Tuesday, November 19, 14:00

Gold-medal game
Tuesday, November 19, 14:00

South Korea and China qualified for the 2014 Ford World Women's Curling Championship

References
General

Specific

External links

2013 in curling
Pacific-Asia Curling Championships
2013 in South Korean sport
International curling competitions hosted by South Korea